David Shafer may refer to:

 David Shafer (politician) (born 1965), American politician
 David Shafer (author), American author, produced Whiskey, Tango, Foxtrot

See also
 David Schafer (born 1955), American artist
 David Shaffer, American pediatric psychiatrist